Columbus RFC is an American rugby union team based in Columbus, Ohio. The flagship team plays in the Midwest Rugby Premiership with an additional team playing in Division III.

History
The club was founded in 1975 as the Scioto Valley RFC.

Notable former players
 Perry Baker
 Steve Finkel
 Jon Estep
 Andy McGarry
 Eric Parthmore
 Rich Schurfeld
 Gary Wilson
 Glynn Merrick
 Ron Keyser
 Terry Larimer

External links
Columbus RFC

American rugby union teams
Rugby clubs established in 1975
Sports teams in Columbus, Ohio